The Overseas Warriors is a Pakistani professional T20 franchise cricket team who compete in the Kashmir Premier League. They were established in 2021 following the announcement of the Kashmir Premier League by the PCB. The team is captained by Asad Shafiq and coached by Azam Khan. The franchise represents the Kashmiri diaspora.

History

2021 season

In the group stage, they won 2 matches and lost 3 but due to them having a better net run rate they qualified for the 1st eliminator ahead of Bagh Stallions. They were knocked out in the 1st eliminator as they were defeated by 4 wickets by Mirpur Royals.

2022 season

In July 2022, Asad Shafiq was announced as Overseas Warriors’ icon player.

Team identity

Current squad

Captains

Coaches

Result summary

Overall result in KPL

Head-to-head record

Source:, Last updated: 31 January 2022

Statistics

Most runs 

Source:, Last updated: 23 August 2022

Most wickets 

Source:, Last Updated: 21 November 2021

References

External links

Cricket teams in Pakistan
Kashmir Premier League (Pakistan)
Sports organizations established in 2021